Hazlitt may refer to:

 Hazlitt (name)
 Hazlitt Theatre, one of the main theatres in Maidstone, Kent
 Hazlitt's, a hotel in Soho, London
 Hazlitt (magazine), a Canadian online literary magazine

See also
 Haslet (disambiguation)
 Haslett
 Hazlet (disambiguation)